Aaron Simpson (born 7 March 1997) is an English professional footballer who plays as a full back for National League South club Chippenham Town. He has previously played for Maidstone United and on loan at Portsmouth, AFC Telford United, Kilmarnock, FC Jumilla, Waterford and Dover Athletic.

Career

Maidstone United
Simpson began his career at Maidstone United. For the first half of the 2014–15 season, Simpson featured for Maidstone eight times in the league and five times in the FA Cup as Maidstone, then of the Isthmian League beat league opposition in Stevenage to set up a second round proper tie with Wrexham. Maidstone lost this match 3-1 and Simpson was also sent off.

Wolverhampton Wanderers
In February 2015, he signed for Wolverhampton Wanderers on a two-year contract.

Portsmouth (loan)
On 31 January 2017, Simpson joined Portsmouth on loan until the end of the season. On 17 March however, he returned to his parent club after failing to make a single appearance on the south-coast.

AFC Telford United (loan)
In August 2017, Simpson joined National League North side AFC Telford United on loan. He made his debut for the club on the opening day of the season, playing the duration of a 1-0 victory at York City.

Kilmarnock (loan)
In January 2018, Simpson joined Kilmarnock on loan.

Dover Athletic
On 23 July 2019, Simpson returned to English football, signing for National League side Dover Athletic. Simpson made 22 appearances in all competition for the Kent side during the 2019–20 season, before he was released at the end of a campaign that was cut short due to the coronavirus pandemic.

Sutton United
Simpson joined fellow National League side Sutton United just before the commencement of the 2020–21 season. He made his debut for the club on the opening day of the season, coming off of the bench in the 38 minute of a 3-0 victory over Maidenhead United. Simpson only appeared twelve times as Sutton won the National League title to gain promotion to the Football League for the first time in their history.

Hemel Hempstead Town
Following his release from Sutton, Simpson joined National League South side Hemel Hempstead Town in September 2021.

Personal life
In 2021, Simpson appeared as a contestant on Series 7 of Love Island.

Career statistics

References

External links

1997 births
Living people
People from Canterbury
Footballers from Kent
English footballers
Expatriate association footballers in the Republic of Ireland
Association football fullbacks
Maidstone United F.C. players
Wolverhampton Wanderers F.C. players
Portsmouth F.C. players
AFC Telford United players
Kilmarnock F.C. players
FC Jumilla players
Waterford F.C. players
Dover Athletic F.C. players
Sutton United F.C. players
Hemel Hempstead Town F.C. players
Scottish Professional Football League players
League of Ireland players
National League (English football) players
Love Island (2015 TV series) contestants